"To Love You More" is a song by Canadian singer Celine Dion, written by David Foster and Edgar Bronfman Jr., writing under the pen-name Junior Miles. It was released as a single in Japan on 21 October 1995 and became a hit, reaching number one on the Oricon Singles Chart and selling 1.5 million copies. The lyrics are about a woman who makes an impassioned plea to her lover so that he does not leave her for another woman.

Background and release
The song was recorded for a popular Japanese TV drama series called Koibito yo (meaning My Dear Lover), and was included on the 1995 Japanese reissue of Dion's album The Colour of My Love. It later appeared on the Asian edition of Falling into You, on Live à Paris, released in most territories outside of the U.S. ("To Love You More" was one of the radio singles promoting this album in Canada), and the U.S. edition of Let's Talk About Love, being released as the third (but promotional only) single from this album. The song was only released as a commercial physical single in Japan, initially as a mini CD single in 1995 and as a maxi-single with remixes by Tony Moran in 1999.

In 1995, Sony Music Entertainment Japan released a promotional video showing Dion performing the original studio version in the recording studio. In 1996, Sony Music Entertainment also released a promotional video showing a live performance from the Falling Into You Around the World Tour, with Taro Hakase on violin.

"To Love You More" became one of the most performed songs by Dion during her live shows and was performed in the setlist of the Falling Into You Around the World Tour, Let's Talk About Love World Tour, A New Day..., the Taking Chances World Tour, the 2018 tour, and the final year of her Las Vegas residency show, Celine. Dion also performed "To Love You More" during her BST Hyde Park concert in London on 5 July 2019 and her Courage World Tour. Live versions of this song can be found on many of Dion's DVDs, including Live in Las Vegas - A New Day.... The track also appeared on all editions of Dion's first English-language greatest hits album All the Way… A Decade of Song in 1999 and My Love: Ultimate Essential Collection in 2008.

"To Love You More" won the International Single Grand Prix Award at the Japan Gold Disc Awards in Japan, as well as an ASCAP Pop Award and two BMI Pop Awards for Most Performed Song in the United States.

Commercial performance
The song became a smash hit in Japan, hitting number one for five weeks and selling 1,500,000 copies. Dion was the first international artist to reach number one on the Oricon Singles Chart since Irene Cara with the song "Flashdance... What a Feeling" in 1983. "To Love You More" remains the second best-selling song by an international artist and the best-selling single by an international female artist in Japan. It is also one of only three international songs that has sold more than 1 million copies. To date, Dion is the most recent North American artist to reach #1 on the chart and only the 4th overall.

In July 2010, a realtone of "To Love You More" was certified gold after selling 100,000 copies.

"To Love You More" was also successful on the American radio, although the edited version played by most US radio stations omitted Kryzler & Company's violin bridge and omitted a sizeable chunk of the song's ending. It spent 8 weeks at number one on the Hot Adult Contemporary Tracks and reached number 11 on the Billboard Hot 100 Airplay. In Canada, "To Love You More" peaked at number four on the Quebec Airplay Chart and number five on the Canadian Adult Contemporary.

Formats and track listings
1995 Japanese CD single
"To Love You More" – 5:32
"To Love You More" (instrumental) – 5:24

1999 Japanese CD single (Dance Mixes)
"To Love You More" (Tony Moran's crossover edit) – 4:53
"To Love You More" (Tony Moran's pop edit) – 5:53
"To Love You More" (Tony Moran's I'll be... waiting vocal mix) – 10:08
"To Love You More" – 5:30

1995 Japanese promo CD single
"To Love You More" (radio edit) – 3:55

1998 US promo CD single
"To Love You More" (radio edit) – 4:39
"To Love You More" (album version) – 5:28

1998 US promo CD and UK promo 12" single
"To Love You More" (Tony Moran's pop edit) – 4:53
"To Love You More" (Tony Moran's crossover edit) – 4:53
"To Love You More" (Tony Moran's I'll be... waiting vocal) – 10:07

1998 US promo 12" single
"To Love You More" (Tony Moran's I'll be... waiting vocal mix) – 10:10
"To Love You More" (Tony Moran's dubbing you more mix) – 9:35

Personnel
Celine Dion – vocals
David Foster – arrangements, keyboards, music, producer
Taro Hakase (Kryzler & Kompany) – violin
Tsuneyoshi Saito (Kryzler & Kompany) – piano, synthesizer
Yoshinobu Takeshita (Kryzler & Kompany) – bass, computer programming
Lillias White, LaChanze, Roz Ryan, Cheryl Freeman and Vanéese Y. Thomas – background vocals
Felipe Elgueta – engineering, programming
Humberto Gatica – engineering, mixing
Vito Luprano – executive producer
Michael Thompson – guitar
Junior Miles – lyrics
Ross Hogarth – mixing
Simon Franglen – synclavier programming

Charts

Weekly charts

Year-end charts

Certifications and sales

Release history

See also
Japan Gold Disc Award
List of best-selling singles in Japan
List of Billboard Adult Contemporary number ones of 1998

References

External links

1995 singles
1995 songs
1990s ballads
Celine Dion songs
Japanese television drama theme songs
Oricon Weekly number-one singles
Pop ballads
Song recordings produced by David Foster
Songs written by David Foster
Torch songs
Sony Music Entertainment Japan singles
550 Music singles
Epic Records singles